Danish Union of Journalists (Dansk Journalistforbund, DJ) is a Danish trade union for journalists, graphic designers, communication officers, photographers, media technicians, etc., which was founded on 1 January 1961. Members are both permanent employees and freelancers.

DJ is an independent trade union not linked to key organizations such as LO, AC and FTF.

The union has 15,500 members (May 2012) of which 2,000 are members through organisations for students in journalistic education.

Publications
The Danish Union of Journalists publishes a member magazine  20 times a year.

List of presidents
 (1961-1971) Carsten Ib Nielsen
 (1971-1975) Vagn Fleischer Michaelsen
 /1975-1980) Carl John Nielsen
 (1980-1984) Hans Erik Larsen
 (1984-1990) Tove Hygum Jakobsen
 (1990-1999) Lars Poulsen
 (1999-2015) Mogens Blicher Bjerregaard [da]
 (2015-2019) Lars Werge Andersen [da]; from
 (2019-present) Tine Johansen

See also
Danish newspaper cartoon illustrators Danske Bladtegnere
Danish Travel Writers’ Association Danske Rejsejournalister 
The Freelancegroup Freelancegruppen
Association for Investigative Journalism Foreningen for Undersøgende Journalistik
Association for Labour Market Journalists Foreningen af Arbejdsmarked Journalister (FAJ)
DONA – Danish Online News Association 
Network FOREIGN 
Police and Court Reporters Association Politi- og Retsreporternes Forening
Pressphotographers Union Pressefotografforbundet
Danish Sports Journalists Danske Sportsjournalister
Association of Danish Teater Journalists Foreningen af Danske Teaterjournalister :da:Foreningen af Danske Teaterjournalister
The Danish Association of Traffic Journalists Trafikjournalisternes Klub i Danmark

External links
Danish Union of Journalists
Journalistens homepage
List of Danish journalist associations

References

Danish journalism organizations
Journalists' trade unions
1961 establishments in Denmark
Trade unions established in 1961
Trade unions in Denmark